Chrysorthenches argentea is a species of moth in the family Plutellidae. It was described by John S. Dugdale in 1996. It is endemic to New Zealand and has been observed in the Buller District and in the West Coast. The larval host is Manoao colensoi. Adults are on the wing in December.

Taxonomy
This species was first described in 1996 by John S. Dugdale using specimens reared from larvae collected on Manoao colensoi and obtained at Giles Creek at the headwaters of Fletcher Creek in the Buller District. The male holotype is held at the New Zealand Arthropod Collection.

Description

The mature lava is between 7 to 8 mm in length, has a brown head and a green or tan body marked with a chevron like pattern.

Dugdale described the adults of this species as follows:
This species can be distinguished from similar appearing species as it lacks the white head and thorax of C. phyllocladi as well as the curved, lengthways stripe at the base of the forewing of C. glypharcha.

Distribution
This species is endemic to New Zealand. As well as the type locality, this species has been collected at Ōkārito and possibly also at National Park, although this latter specimen was reared from larvae on  Halocarpus bidwillii and was unable to be substantiated.

Behaviour 
The almost matured larvae consume the tips of shoots of their host, turning them brown and causing them to drop from the tree after a few weeks. The adult moths are on the wing in December.

Hosts

The larval host of this species is Manoao colensoi.

DNA analysis 
In 2020 this species along with the other species in the genus Chrysorthenches had their DNA and morphological characters studied.

References

Moths described in 1996
Plutellidae
Moths of New Zealand
Endemic fauna of New Zealand
Taxa named by John Stewart Dugdale
Endemic moths of New Zealand